Andrew Welsh (28 June 1917 – 1990) was an English footballer who made 46 appearances in the Football League playing as a left back for Darlington in the 1930s. He was on the books of Charlton Athletic, Manchester City and Northampton Town, without playing for them in the League.

References

1917 births
1990 deaths
People from Annfield Plain
Footballers from County Durham
English footballers
Association football fullbacks
Charlton Athletic F.C. players
Manchester City F.C. players
Darlington F.C. players
Northampton Town F.C. players
English Football League players
Place of death missing